The Untxin is a coastal river of the French Basque Country, in Nouvelle-Aquitaine, Southwest France.

It rises on the northern slope of the Xoldokogaina, elevation , in the east of Biriatou.
The motorway of the Basque Coast (A63) is settled in its valley. It collects in Urrugne waters from the Mandale. The Untxin flows into the ocean in Ciboure.

Main tributaries 

 Arrolako Erreka

Départements and towns 

 Pyrénées Atlantiques: Urrugne, Ciboure.

References

Rivers of France
0Untxin
Rivers of Pyrénées-Atlantiques
Rivers of Nouvelle-Aquitaine